is a Jamaican-born Japanese track and field sprinter who competes in the 100 metres and 200 metres. His personal best of 10.03 in the 100m gives him Japan's 6th fastest time. He is a two-time East Asian Games gold medallist and a relay bronze medallist at the World Junior Championships in Athletics. His mother is Japanese and his father is Jamaican.

In the 2016 Olympic Games in Rio de Janeiro, Cambridge was part of the 4 × 100 m relay for Japan, which took the silver medal in the final.

Biography
Cambridge was born in Jamaica to a Japanese mother and a Jamaican father. His given name Asuka generally signifies "flying bird" in Japanese language and has also been a city name and period name in Ancient Japan (see Asuka period).
When he was 2 years old, his family moved from Jamaica to Osaka, Japan. He played football until the age of twelve. When he was fourteen, he moved to Tokyo from Osaka.
Cambridge then focused on athletics, running sprinting events for his high school in Tokyo and later at Nihon University, where he studied literature and science. He was fourth in the 100 m at the 2011 National Sports Festival of Japan. At the 2012 World Junior Championships in Athletics he narrowly missed out on the 200 m final, but he excelled in the relay alongside Kazuma Oseto, Akiyuki Hashimoto and Kazuki Kanamori – the team ran an Asian junior record of 39.01 seconds in the heats (the fastest of all the qualifiers) and were just one hundredth slower in the final, where they claimed the bronze medals.

In 2013, Cambridge improved his personal best to 10.33 seconds for the 100 m and 20.62 seconds for the 200 m. He won his first international gold medals at the 2013 East Asian Games by beating compatriot Shōta Iizuka in the 200 m and then teaming up with his rival to help secure the 4×100 metres relay title for Japan. Their time of 38.44 seconds was a new East Asian Games record – an improvement of nearly half a second.

On June 25, 2016, Cambridge won the 100 m final at the Japan Championships in 10.16 to qualify for the Rio Olympics.

On August 19, 2016, Cambridge won a silver medal in the 4 × 100 m relay for Japan at the 2016 Summer Olympics by setting a new Asian record of 37.60 seconds with teammates Ryōta Yamagata, Yoshihide Kiryū, and Shōta Iizuka.

On August 29, 2020, Cambridge won the 100m final with a new personal best of 10.03 at the Athlete Night Games in Fukui.

Japan's top 10 records for men's 100m

References

External links

 
 
 
 

Living people
1993 births
Japanese male sprinters
Olympic male sprinters
Olympic athletes of Japan
Olympic silver medalists for Japan
Olympic silver medalists in athletics (track and field)
Athletes (track and field) at the 2016 Summer Olympics
Medalists at the 2016 Summer Olympics
Asian Games gold medalists for Japan
Asian Games medalists in athletics (track and field)
Athletes (track and field) at the 2018 Asian Games
Medalists at the 2018 Asian Games
World Athletics Championships athletes for Japan
World Athletics Championships medalists
Japan Championships in Athletics winners
Japanese people of Jamaican descent